Live from the Lake Coast is the first DVD release from Umphrey's McGee and features excerpts from the band's two-night stand at the Skyline Stage in Chicago, on July 26 & 27, 2002. It is the only video to feature original drummer Mike Mirro, who would leave the band at the end of the year.

Includes extensive band bios and bonus features.

Track listing
 All In Time
 Utopian Fir
 Pay The Snucka (Part 3)
 The Fuzz
 Hajimemashite
 Jimmy Stewart
 Andy's Last Beer
 Divisions (setbreak)
 Hurt Bird Bath
 2x2
 Jimmy Stewart
 The Triple Wide
 40's Theme
 All In Time (continued)
 Mullet Over (credits)

Personnel
 Brendan Bayliss: guitar, vocals
 Jake Cinninger: guitar, vocals
 Joel Cummins: keyboards
 Ryan Stasik: bass
 Mike Mirro: drums
 Andy Farag: percussion

2002 video albums
2002 live albums
Umphrey's McGee video albums
Live video albums